Aleksey Vladimirovich Lebedev (born 29 May 1973, Murmansk) is a Russian screenwriter, playwright in animation, director, producer and voice actor. He is most notable for being the main screenwriter of the animated series Kikoriki.

Biography 
Aleksey Lebedev was born on 29 May 1973 in Murmansk.

He graduated from the Suvorov Military School in Leningrad and the St. Petersburg Humanitarian University of Trade Unions (director department, acting and directing course with Zinovy Korogodsky) in 1997. In 2001, he graduated from the faculty of Mathematics and Mechanics at the Saint Petersburg State University. For some time, he was working as an actor and director of the drama theatre and also as a software developer.

He wrote his first script in 1998 for a comedy film The Biedermeier Wardrobe which was never produced.

In 2003, he was invited to the newly created Petersburg Animation Studio as a candidate for the main screenwriter of the Kikoriki series. He was elected right away after trying different people and that is how he came to be the main screenwriter of the animated series. From 2003 to 2012 he wrote over 230 screenplays for the traditional six-minute episodes of the original series (164 of which were released from 2003 to 2012, and 10 of which were released in their 3D spin-off, and the last seven scripts were dedicated to the seven deadly sins), 12 10-minute screenplays for the 3D spin-off Kikoriki. New Adventures, and the full-length film Kikoriki. Team Invincible. During its time the film was very popular in Russia and abroad. His reaction to the film after he saw it himself was quite negative:

He also wrote a screenplay for the next film, Kikoriki. The Legend of the Golden Dragon, but was denied. The rest of his six-minute screenplays are being filmed in the new season that is being released since 2020.

In 2012, Aleksey Lebedev left the Petersburg Animation Studio to start production of his new project, The Nuclear Forest, but the series closed in 2014 due to low finances.

In 2015, Lebedev returned to the Kikoriki series for a while to write 11 screenplays for the 3D spin-off Kikoriki. Sport.

Since 2018, Aleksey Lebedev cooperates with Soyuzmultfilm and is the author of two animated shows, Pirate School and Adventures of Petya and the Wolf.

Filmography

Screenwriter 

 Kikoriki (2003-2012; 2020–present)
 Kikoriki. Team Invincible (2011)
 Kikoriki. New Adventures in 3D (2012-2013)
 Nuclear Forest (2012-2014)
 Kikoriki. Sport (2015)
 Pirate School (2018-2020)
 Adventures of Petya and the Wolf (2018–present)
 Kikoriki. Operation Santa Claus (2019)

Director, Producer, and Animator 

 Nuclear Forest (2012-2014)
 Pirate School (2018-2020)
 Adventures of Petya and the Wolf (2018–present)

Voice actor (selected) 

 Kikoriki (2003-2012) — football commentator, voice (episodes "The Weed!" and "Soccer Game, 1st Half")
 Nuclear Forest (2012-2014) — Mikhail "Michel" Lermontov, voice

Sources

External links 

 Aleksey Lebedev on animator.ru
 
 Screenwriter of Kikoriki about animation
 Aleksey Lebedev — «I can turn any microscopic anecdote into a story»
 Aleksey Lebedev — The moral image of new generations? Where is it, Modern Children's Literature? And what is the future of children's writers?
 The inside of Chico from Kikoriki
 Aleksey Lebedev on his Nuclear Forest series

1973 births
Living people
Russian male stage actors
Russian dramatists and playwrights
Russian screenwriters
Russian theatre directors
Russian film producers
Russian animators
Russian male voice actors